Liverpool Beach is the crescent-shaped beach extending 1.8 km on the east side of Walker Bay on the south coast of Livingston Island in the South Shetland Islands, Antarctica.  It is situated on the west side of the small ice-free promontory ending in Hannah Point, and bounded by Hannah Point to the west, Ustra Peak to the northeast and the terminus of Verila Glacier to the north.  The picturesque beach is one of the most popular tourist sites in Antarctica, frequented by cruise ships. It is also accessible by Zodiac boats from the Bulgarian base and the Spanish base on the island situated 12 km to the east and 11 km to the east-southeast respectively.

The beach is named after the British city of Liverpool, the home port of many 19th century sealing ships operating in the South Shetlands including the sealer Hannah after which the adjacent point is named.

Location
British mapping in 1821, 1962 and 1968, Argentine in 1959 and 1980, Chilean in 1971, Spanish in 1991, and Bulgarian in 2005, 2009 and 2017.

Maps
 L.L. Ivanov. Antarctica: Livingston Island and Greenwich, Robert, Snow and Smith Islands. Scale 1:120000 topographic map. Troyan: Manfred Wörner Foundation, 2010.  (First edition 2009. )
 Antarctic Digital Database (ADD). Scale 1:250000 topographic map of Antarctica. Scientific Committee on Antarctic Research (SCAR). Since 1993, regularly upgraded and updated.
 L.L. Ivanov. Antarctica: Livingston Island and Smith Island. Scale 1:100000 topographic map. Manfred Wörner Foundation, 2017.

References
 Liverpool Beach. SCAR Composite Gazetteer of Antarctica.
 Bulgarian Antarctic Gazetteer. Antarctic Place-names Commission. (details in Bulgarian, basic data in English)

External links
 Liverpool Beach. Copernix satellite image

Beaches of Livingston Island
Bulgaria and the Antarctic
Tourism in Antarctica